Samad Timileyin Kadiri (born 8 September 1995) is a Nigerian professional footballer who plays as a forward.

Club career
Kadiri played for Bayelsa United and Sunshine Stars in the Nigeria Professional Football League.

International career
In 2018, Kadiri played for the Nigeria national B team in the first half of a friendly match against Atlético Madrid.

Honours
Ahed
 Lebanese Elite Cup: 2022

References

External links

 

1995 births
Living people
Nigerian footballers
Association football forwards
Bayelsa United F.C. players
Sunshine Stars F.C. players
Lobi Stars F.C. players
Enyimba F.C. players
Kwara United F.C. players
Al Ahed FC players
Nigeria Professional Football League players
Lebanese Premier League players
Nigerian expatriate footballers
Nigerian expatriate sportspeople in Lebanon
Expatriate footballers in Lebanon